Industrialny (masculine), Industrialnaya (feminine), or Industrialnoye (neuter) may refer to:

 Industrialny City District (disambiguation), several districts in the countries of the former Soviet Union
 Industrialny (rural locality) (Industrialnaya, Industrialnoye), several rural localities in Russia

See also
 Industrial (disambiguation)
 Industry (disambiguation)
 Promyshlenny (disambiguation)